Tamworth may refer to:

Places

England
 Tamworth, Staffordshire
 Tamworth (UK Parliament constituency)

Australia
 Tamworth, New South Wales
 Tamworth Airport
 Tamworth Regional Council
 Electoral district of Tamworth

United States and Canada
 Tamworth, Virginia
 Tamworth, New Hampshire
 Tamworth, Ontario

Other
 Tamworth pig, a breed of pig, also known as the sandyback
 Tamworth F.C. an English football club in Tamworth, Staffordshire

See also
 Tamworth Two, a pair of escaped pigs
 Tamworth Manifesto, a Conservative Party political manifesto of 1834
 Tanworth-in-Arden, Warwickshire, England
 John Tamworth (died 1569), English courtier